Blue Sky Mining is the seventh studio album by Australian alternative rock band Midnight Oil, released on 9 February 1990 under the Columbia Records label. It received high ratings from critics. In March of that year, the album peaked at number one on the ARIA Albums Chart for two weeks. A limited release of the record featured clear blue vinyl.

Background
Blue Sky Mining, produced by Warne Livesey, was released by CBS/Columbia on 9 February 1990. It peaked at number one on the Australian Recording Industry Association (ARIA) albums chart. It stayed at number one for two weeks in Australia and had Top 5 chart success in Sweden, Switzerland and Norway. It peaked at number 20 on the Billboard 200 and number 28 on the UK charts. The album was "more defiant and outspoken" than their previous work; the single "Blue Sky Mine" describes asbestos exposure in the Wittenoom mine tragedy. The lead single peaked at number eight on the ARIA singles charts, top 15 in Norway and Switzerland, number 47 on Billboard Hot 100 and number one on both their Mainstream and Modern Rock Tracks charts, and appeared on the UK charts. The second single, "Forgotten Years", was more moderately successful, reaching number 26 on the ARIA singles chart, number 97 in the UK, number 11 on the Mainstream Rock Tracks, and number one on the Modern Rock Tracks.

Manager Gary Morris, accepting awards for Midnight Oil, was criticised for a speech lasting 20 minutes.

Track listing

 Some early Australian copies included the track "You May Not Be Released" - it was the B-side to a 12-inch issue of "Forgotten Years," and it is believed that this only appeared on the first 1,000 LP copies.  It also appeared on early cassette copies and CDs.

Charts

Weekly charts

Year-end charts

Certifications

Personnel
Midnight Oil
 Peter Garrett - lead vocals, harmonica 
 Bones Hillman - bass, vocals
 Robert Hirst - drums, vocals
 Jim Moginie - guitars, keyboards, vocals
 Martin Rotsey - guitars

Additional personnel
 Warne Livesey - additional keyboards
 Jeremy Smith - French horn
 Phillip Hartl - String Leader
 Glad and Carl - Horn Swells

References

External links
 Midnight Oil

1990 albums
Midnight Oil albums
Columbia Records albums
Albums produced by Warne Livesey
ARIA Award-winning albums